Ina Koch (born 1958) is a German bioinformatics researcher who holds the Chair of Molecular Bioinformatics at Goethe University Frankfurt, in the faculty of mathematics and computer science. She has published research on the use of maximum common subgraphs and Petri nets to model problems in biology, and on the prediction of deleterious alleles.

Education and career

After postdoctoral research with Jens Reich at the Max Delbrück Center for Molecular Medicine in the Helmholtz Association, and with Martin Vingron at the Max Planck Institute for Molecular Genetics, she took a professorship in 2002 at the Berlin University of Applied Sciences and Technology. She moved in 2005 to the University of Jena, and again in 2010 to her present position in Frankfurt.

References

External links

1958 births
Living people
Computational biologists
German bioinformaticians
Women bioinformaticians
German biologists
German computer scientists
German women biologists
German women computer scientists
Leipzig University alumni
Academic staff of the University of Jena
Academic staff of Goethe University Frankfurt